Dyer is an unincorporated community in Webster County, West Virginia, United States.

G. M. Dyer, an early postmaster, gave the community his name.

References

Unincorporated communities in Webster County, West Virginia